The 2005–06 Florida Gators men's basketball team represented the University of Florida in the sport of basketball during the 2005–06 college basketball season.  The Gators competed in Division I of the National Collegiate Athletic Association (NCAA) and the Eastern Division of the Southeastern Conference (SEC).  They were led by head coach Billy Donovan, and played their home games in the O'Connell Center on the university's Gainesville, Florida campus.

The Gators started the season looking to end their recent streak of losing in the first two rounds of the NCAA tournament.  They finished the season with a 24–6 record entering the SEC Championship.  They won all three games and received a No. 3 seed in the NCAA tournament, eventually playing in the final against UCLA.  On April 3, 2006 Florida beat UCLA 73–57 to win their first ever NCAA Championship.

Class of 2005

|-
| colspan="7" style="padding-left:10px;" | Overall Recruiting Rankings:     Scout – 21     Rivals – NR       ESPN – 
|}

Roster

Coaches

Schedule and results

|-
!colspan=8 style=| Exhibition

|-
!colspan=8 style=| Regular season

|-
!colspan=8 style=| SEC Tournament

|-
!colspan=8 style=| NCAA Division I Tournament

Accomplishments

First National Championship in school history.

References 

Florida Gators men's basketball seasons
Florida Gators
Florida Gators men's basketball team
Florida Gators men's basketball team
Florida
NCAA Division I men's basketball tournament Final Four seasons
NCAA Division I men's basketball tournament championship seasons